Andi Setiawan (born 6 September 1984) is an Indonesian professional footballer who currently plays as a goalkeeper for Persela Lamongan in the Indonesia Soccer Championship.

External links
 
 Player profile at goal.com
 Player profil at ligaindonesia.co.id
 The other Andi Setiawan at andisetiawan.com

1984 births
Living people
Indonesian footballers
Liga 1 (Indonesia) players
Persiba Bantul players
Place of birth missing (living people)
Association football goalkeepers